Suzhou railway station is a station on Line 2 of Suzhou Rail Transit. The station is located at the Suzhou railway station in Gusu District of Suzhou. It started service on December 28, 2013 with the opening of Line 2.

References

Railway stations in Jiangsu
Suzhou Rail Transit stations
Railway stations in China opened in 2013